Bradley Edward Delp (June 12, 1951 – March 9, 2007) was an American musician who was the original lead vocalist and occasional rhythm guitarist of the rock band Boston. He joined Boston in 1970 and appeared on every album with the exception of Walk On (1994) and also participated in every tour prior to his death in 2007.

Early life
Delp was born in Peabody, Massachusetts, on June 12, 1951, his parents were French-Canadian immigrants. He was raised in Danvers, Massachusetts.

Musical career

In 1969, guitarist Barry Goudreau introduced Delp to Tom Scholz, who was looking for a singer to complete some demo recordings. Eventually Scholz formed the short-lived band Mother's Milk (1973–74), which included Delp and Goudreau. After producing a demo, Epic Records eventually signed the act. Mother's Milk was renamed Boston, and the self-titled debut album (recorded in 1975, although many tracks had been written years before) was released in August 1976. Delp performed all of the lead and all backing harmony vocals, including all layered vocal overdubs.

Boston's debut album has sold more than 17 million copies, and produced rock standards such as "More Than a Feeling", "Foreplay/Long Time" and "Peace of Mind". Delp co-wrote "Smokin'" along with Scholz, and wrote the album's closing track, "Let Me Take You Home Tonight".

Their next album, Don't Look Back, was released two years later in August 1978. Its release spawned new hits such as the title track, "Party", and the ballad "A Man I'll Never Be". As they did with "Smokin'", Delp and Scholz collaborated on "Party", and Delp penned "Used to Bad News".

After the first two Boston albums, Delp sang vocals on Barry Goudreau's self-titled solo album, released in 1980. Scholz's perfectionism and a legal battle with their record company stalled any further Boston albums until 1986 when the band released Third Stage. Delp co-wrote the songs "Cool the Engines" and "Can'tcha Say (You Believe in Me)/Still in Love" for the album, and both songs got significant airplay.

Though probably best known for the soaring vocals and range of his "golden" voice and for singing all harmony parts on every song, Delp was also a multi-instrumentalist, playing guitar, harmonica and keyboards. He wrote or co-wrote songs for Boston, RTZ, Orion the Hunter, Lisa Guyer, and other artists.

In 1991, Delp and Goudreau formed a band called RTZ. After Boston released the album Walk On in 1994 with Fran Cosmo on vocals, Delp and Boston reunited later that year for another major tour. Delp continued to record vocals on several albums and projects, including new tracks for Boston's 1997 Greatest Hits compilation and their 2002 release Corporate America.

From the mid-1990s until his death in 2007, Delp played in a side project when he had time off from Boston – a Beatles tribute band called Beatlejuice. During this time, Delp also co-wrote and recorded with former Boston bandmate Barry Goudreau, and in 2003 released the CD Delp and Goudreau.

Personal life
Delp was married and divorced twice, and had two children by his second wife, Micki, who had been a flight attendant on tour with Boston. Micki's sister, Connie, subsequently married band member Goudreau. Brad and Micki married in 1980 and divorced in 1996. He was a vegetarian for over 30 years, and contributed to a number of charitable causes.

Death and aftermath
Sometime between 11:00 pm on March 8 and 1:20 am on March 9, 2007, Delp died by suicide by carbon monoxide poisoning in his home on 55 Academy Avenue, in Atkinson, New Hampshire. He left various notes scattered from his car to the interior of his home. The Atkinson police discovered his body on the floor of his master bathroom after his fiancée, Pamela Sullivan saw a dryer vent tube connected to the exhaust pipe of Delp's car. Two charcoal grills were found to have been placed in the bathtub and lit, causing the room to fill with smoke. A suicide note was paperclipped to the neck of his T-shirt, which read the same as a character's note from Twin Peaks: "Mr. Brad Delp. 'J'ai une âme solitaire'. I am a lonely soul." Delp left four sealed envelopes in his office addressed to his children, his former wife Micki, his fiancée, and a couple who were not named by the media. He was 55 years old. The following day, Boston's website was replaced with a simple black background and white text message: "We've just lost the nicest guy in rock and roll."

Delp's cause of death was ruled a suicide. The reason for Delp's suicide has been the subject of contradictory news reports and various lawsuits. A series of interviews conducted by the Boston Herald alleged that lingering hard feelings from Boston's disbandment in the 1980s and personal tension between Delp and bandleader Scholz drove the singer to take his life by suicide. Scholz denied these claims but lost the defamation suits he filed in response. Court documents from the trials detail Scholz stating that Delp was plagued by personal problems. Boston Herald attorneys pointed to testimony from former Boston members, other local musicians, Delp's doctor, and Delp's friends, including Meg Sullivan (his fiancée's sister), many of whom say the singer disliked Scholz, desperately wanted to quit the band, and was tormented by his role as middleman in an ugly conflict between Scholz and former band members. All of this was summarized in a 140-page statement filed by the Herald in April 2012.

Additional sworn testimony by Meg Sullivan revealed an additional explanation for Delp’s suicide: Delp was housemates with Meg, fiancée Pamela's sister, for two and a half years before his death. On February 28, 2007, Meg discovered a hidden camera planted in her room. After Meg confronted him, Delp admitted to planting the camera and later wrote a series of emails pleading for forgiveness. Todd Winmill, Meg's boyfriend, implored Delp to admit his wrongdoings to Pamela on March 3. After promising to tell her in a few days, Delp purchased the grills and tubing he later used to commit suicide. The Atkinson Police found his body on March 9 in the room where several notes were written by Delp, one of which read: "I have had bouts of depression and thoughts of suicide since I was a teenager … [Pamela] was my 'ray of sunshine', but sometimes even a ray of sunshine is no substitute for a good psychiatrist."

On October 16, 2007, Barry Goudreau released one final song with Delp on vocals, titled "Rockin Away". Written and recorded in mid 2006, co-written with Goudreau, it is an autobiography of Delp's musical career. According to "America's Music Charts", the song reached #20 on the rock charts in January 2008.

On what would have been Delp's 61st birthday, June 12, 2012, Jenna Delp, his daughter and president of the Brad Delp Foundation, released an MP3 on the foundation website of a "never before released" song that was written and recorded by Delp in 1973. It was announced the foundation intended to release a complete album of Delp's solo work at some point in the future, which would encompass a span of 30 years of previously unreleased material written and recorded by Delp and his closest friends.

On November 25, 2015, the Supreme Judicial Court of Massachusetts found in favor of the Boston Herald and Micki Delp in a defamation lawsuit brought by Scholz. In its ruling, the court said that statements attributing Delp's suicide to Scholz were "statements of opinion and not verifiable fact and therefore could not form the basis of a claim of defamation". On February 23, 2016, Scholz filed a petition for certiorari asking the Supreme Court of the United States to allow his defamation lawsuit to proceed. On June 6, 2016, the Supreme Court declined to review the case.

Discography

with Boston

Boston (1976)
Don't Look Back (1978)
Third Stage (1986)
Corporate America (2002)

with Barry Goudreau
Barry Goudreau (1980)

with Orion the Hunter
Orion the Hunter (1984)

with RTZ
Return to Zero (1991)
Lost (1998)
 Lost and Found (2004)

with Delp and Goudreau
Delp and Goudreau (2003)
"Rockin' Away" (2007)

with Mark "Guitar" Miller
Whatcha Gonna Do! (2008)

Other appearances
Keith Emerson - Best Revenge - Playing For Keeps (1982)
Bruce Arnold - Orpheus Again (2010)

References

External links

 
 Brad Delp Foundation

1951 births
2007 deaths
American rock singers
American tenors
Boston (band) members
American people of French-Canadian descent
Countertenors
People from Peabody, Massachusetts
Suicides by carbon monoxide poisoning
Suicides in New Hampshire
Singers from Massachusetts
20th-century American singers
21st-century American singers
People from Atkinson, New Hampshire
2007 suicides
20th-century American male singers